is a Japanese former professional baseball catcher.  He played for Nippon Ham Fighters in the Japan Pacific League in parts of five seasons from 1996 to 2002.

References

Japanese baseball players
Nippon Ham Fighters players
1973 births
Living people
People from Abiko, Chiba
Baseball people from Chiba Prefecture